Martin "Marty" D. Wolfson (born August 3, 1951) is an American Thoroughbred racehorse trainer. He embarked on a professional training career in the early 1970s.

Early life 
He is the son of Louis Wolfson, owner of Florida's Harbor View Farm who won the U.S. Triple Crown in 1978 with two-time American Horse of the Year,  Affirmed. He spent a large part of his childhood on the family horse farm near Ocala in Marion County, Florida. He is the youngest of four siblings.

Early career 
Wolfson received his horse-training license when he was 18 years old, and began training with a few of his father's horses at Calder Race Course in Miami Gardens.

Based at Calder Race Course in Miami Gardens, Florida, where he is a Calder Hall of Fame inductee, Marty Wolfson has conditioned horses for his late father as well as the prominent horsepersons such as Mike Pegram,  Charlotte Weber, and Edmund Gann, as well as John Franks and Fred Hooper.

In 2006, Wolfson earned the most important win of his career when Miesque's Approval captured the Breeders' Cup Mile.

Wolfson earned over $53.6 million in purses during the course of his career. He realized 1,682 wins from 9,059 starts. HIs best year was 2009 in which he won 67 races of 275 starts, earning $4.2 million. In 2015 his career started to fail, with only 29 of 197 starts winners, and 2016 was even worse, only winning 13% of his starts.

Personal life 
At age 21 he married his high school sweetheart, but divorced after a year and a half. He was married to Karla for 35 years, separating in 2011.

Wolfson was featured nude in the November 1978 issue of Playgirl magazine.

References

 Martin Wolfson at the NTRA

1951 births
Living people
American horse trainers
American people of Lithuanian-Jewish descent
Sportspeople from Washington, D.C.
People from Miami Gardens, Florida
Sportspeople from Miami-Dade County, Florida